Acacia gunnii, commonly known as ploughshare wattle or dog's tooth wattle, is a woody shrub which is endemic to south-eastern Australia found in dry heaths and woodlands. It ranges from Queensland, then New South Wales, Australian Capital Territory, Victoria, South Australia, down to Tasmania. Acacia gunnii grows to up to 1 metre high and has prickly phyllodes which are 4 to 15 mm long. The cream to pale yellow  globular flowerheads appear singly in the axils of the phyllodes in June to October,  followed by curved or coiled seed pods which are 40 mm long and 4 to 5 mm wide. Acacia gunnii grows up to 1 meter tall and has prickly phyllodes which are 4 to 15mm in length with cream to pale-yellow globular flower heads appearing in phyllode axils in June through to October, followed by curved or coiled seed pods which are 40mm long and 4 to 5 mm wide. The species was first formally described by English botanist George Bentham in the London Journal of Botany in 1842. It occurs in South Australia, Victoria, Tasmania, New South Wales, Australian Capital Territory, and Queensland.

Description 
Acacia gunnii is a woody decumbent to erect shrub up to 1 meter in height, branchlets are terete usually covered with stiff hairs. Dark green phyllodes are asymmetric, can be sessile, variable in shape usually with a pronounced gland on adaxial margin near or below middle. Phyllodes are 4-15mm long and 1.4-4mm across and appear glabrous or finely haired with a prominent mid-vein, sometimes the apex pungent pointed.

Inflorescences are simple with 1 in the axis of phyllodes, peduncles are hairy, 4–15 mm in length with the head being globose, 20-30 flowered, cream to yellow coloured, and 5-8mm in diameter.

Pods are more or less straight being 40mm long and 4-5mm in width, dark brown to black containing longitudinal to oblique seeds. Pods are chartaceous to coriaceous, glaberous and occasionally are covered in hair.

Taxonomy 
The species was first formally described by English botanist George Bentham in the London Journal of Botany in 1842.

Botanical Classification 
Acacia gunnii is a member of the plant genus Acacia, commonly known as the Wattle's, which belong to the sub-family Mimosoidea, which is under the family Fabaceae. Globally there are approximately 1350  Acacia species, and they are the largest group of Australian vascular plants with near 1000 different species.

The Fabaceae family is split into three distinct sub-families:

 Sub-family Faboideae (typical ‘pea-flowered’ plants)
 Sub-family Mimosoideae (Acacia and relatives)
 Sub-family Caesalpinioideae (Senna, Cassia and relatives).

However, recent studies have shown that a new classification system consisting of six sub-families within Fabaceae is possible, and under such classification system the genus Acacia  isincluded in the sub-family Caesalpinioideae, however this is yet to be adopted by the Australasian Virtual Herbarium.

Hybrids with other species 
Acacia gunnii is reported to have hybridised with Acacia ulicifolia and Acacia brownii in New South Wales and Victoria which has resulted in specimens with elongated phyllodes and with a much reduced gland angle.  Possible hybrids with elongated phyllodes occur in the same locations as the normal form for each species.

Distribution and habitat 
Acacia gunni  is a widespread woody shrub species along the eastern seaboard of Australia. It is commonly found along the Great Divide and associated slopes from the Grampions, Victoria, through to near Stanthorpe in Queensland, It is also found uncommonly in Tasmania. Acacia gunnii occurs on rocky hillsides and amongst rock outcrops in open dry sclerophyll forest usually mainly composed ofEucalyptus olbliqua and Eucalyptus baxteri as the dominant Eucalyptus species. It is generally associated with sandy loam soils where rainfall is around 500 – 1000 mm per annum. It is most abundant in regions of partially disturbed and open rocky habitat with sparse understory, commonly, along track/road edges.

References

gunnii
Flora of the Australian Capital Territory
Flora of New South Wales
Flora of Queensland
Flora of South Australia
Flora of Tasmania
Flora of Victoria (Australia)
Fabales of Australia